Strategic Highway 2 (S-2), or more popularly known as Kohala–Muzaffarabad Road (Urdu, Pahari(( hindko))) is a 40 km long Strategic Highway linking Kohala with Muzaffarabad in Azad Jammu and Kashmir.

Route
The S-2 serves as a continuation of the E75 Murree Expressway, thus connecting the federal capital Islamabad with the Kashmiri capital Muzaffarabad.

Improvements and upgrades
Improvements and upgrades to the road began in 2013 under 3 packages
 Kohala-Dulai section 
 Dulai- Muzaffarabad section 
 Chatter Kalas and Dulai Bridges

See also 
 National Highways of Pakistan

References

External links
 National Highway Authority

Roads in Azad Kashmir
S2